Northeast Plaza is a  strip mall-style shopping center on Buford Highway in Brookhaven, Georgia just east of the Buckhead area of Atlanta. The center was built in late 1957 and renovated in 1986. In the mid-1980s it ranked as the 12th largest retail center in the Atlanta area.

In the mid-1980s the center was re-branded "Fashion Square" but this was later dropped in favor of the original Northeast Plaza name.

In 2000, major tenants included a Publix supermarket, a 12-screen theater, China Cabinet and The Avenue. At that time,  of the center's space was vacant, and new owners EIG Operating Partnership, who bought the center for $33 million, hoped to fill those vacancies with high-end antique stores and galleries.

In 2012 the center was primarily occupied by discount and ethnic retailers. The largest single space, 56,000 sq. ft., once a J.C. Penney catalog store, then a Publix, was until 2011 the Mercado del Pueblo Hispanic supermarket. The vacant unit was to be acquired by G-Mart International Foods, a retailer aiming at the Korean-American and other ethnic markets. As of January 2013, the store was operating under the "Mercado del Pueblo" branding. Other tenants include Family Dollar, Dollar Tree, dd's Discounts, a Goodwill Industries store, Funtime Bowl, Metro Pawn Shop, and Ryan's cafeteria. Numerous ethnic restaurants are located in the center including Bangladeshi, Ethiopian, Mexican and Peruvian, as are a bowling alley, St. Joseph's Mercy Clinic, and the Atlanta Ballroom nightclub.

References

External links
"Northeast Plaza", Strip Mall Ethnography site
Northeast Plaza Cinema page on Cinema Treasures website

Shopping malls established in 1957
Shopping malls in the Atlanta metropolitan area
1957 establishments in Georgia (U.S. state)
Buildings and structures in DeKalb County, Georgia
Brookhaven, Georgia